China Grove Roller Mill is a historic roller mill building located at China Grove, Rowan County, North Carolina.  It was built in 1903, and is a three-story, rectangular brick building, with several later additions.  It retains the intact original milling machinery.

It was listed on the National Register of Historic Places in 1983.

References

Grinding mills in North Carolina
Grinding mills on the National Register of Historic Places in North Carolina
Industrial buildings completed in 1904
Buildings and structures in Rowan County, North Carolina
National Register of Historic Places in Rowan County, North Carolina